The Office of the Secretary of Defense Award for Excellence is an award of the United States government presented by the Office of the Secretary of Defense for civilian service. The award is bestowed on individuals who have made a significant contribution to the mission of the Department of Defense. The Office of the Secretary of Defense is the approval authority. The award consists of an engraved plaque that carries the seal of the United States Department of Defense.

Notable Recipients 
Dr. Barry Boehm
 David McDermott
 Gregory A. Poland, M.D.
 Frank Rose
 Sri Srinivasan
 Oona A. Hathaway
Mason R. McMaster
Kenneth W. Taylor
John L Martin
Curtis L. Day
Mark W. Tippett

References

Civil awards and decorations of the United States